Pancras (Latin: Sanctus Pancratius) was a Roman citizen who converted to Christianity and was beheaded for his faith at the age of fourteen, around the year 304. His name is Greek (Παγκράτιος) and means "the one that holds everything".

From an early stage, Pancras was venerated together with Nereus and Achilleus in a shared feast day and Mass formula on 12 May. In 1595, 25 years after Pope Pius V promulgated the Tridentine Missal, Domitilla was also added.

Since 1969, Pancras has been venerated separately, still on 12 May. He is, traditionally, the second of the Ice Saints.
In the Syriac traditions he is known as Mor Izozoel (Mar Azazael) remembered on 12 May and 12 August. He is the saint of children.

The London district of St Pancras, and by extension, the railway station of the same name, is named after Pancras.

Legend

Because he was said to have been martyred at the age of fourteen during the persecution under Diocletian, Pancras would have been born around 289, at a place designated as near Synnada, a city of Phrygia Salutaris, to parents of Roman citizenship. His mother Cyriada died during childbirth, while his father Cleonius died when Pancras was eight years old.  Pancras was entrusted to his uncle Dionysius' care. They both moved to Rome to live in a villa on the Caelian Hill. They converted to Christianity, and Pancras became a zealous adherent of the religion.

During the persecution of Christians by Emperor Diocletian, around 303 AD, he was brought before the authorities and asked to perform a sacrifice to the Roman gods. Diocletian, impressed with the boy's determination to resist, promised him wealth and power, but Pancras refused, and finally the emperor ordered him to be beheaded on the Via Aurelia, on 12 May 303 AD; this traditional year of his martyrdom cannot be squared with the saint's defiance of Diocletian in Rome, which the emperor had not visited since 286, nor with the mention of Cornelius (251–253) as Bishop of Rome at the time of the martyrdom, as the most recent monograph on Pancras' texts and cult has pointed out.

A Roman matron named Ottavilla recovered Pancras' body, covered it with balsam, wrapped it in precious linens, and buried it in a newly built sepulchre dug in the Catacombs of Rome. Pancras' head was placed in the reliquary that still exists today in the Basilica of Saint Pancras.

Veneration

Devotion to Pancras existed from the fifth century onwards, for the basilica of Saint Pancras was built by Pope Symmachus (498–514), on the place where the body of the young martyr had been buried; his earliest passio seems to have been written during this time. Pope Gregory the Great gave impetus to the cult of Pancras, sending Augustine to England carrying relics of that saint and including his legend in Liber in gloria martyrum (for this reason, many English churches are dedicated to Pancras; St Pancras Old Church in London is one of the oldest sites of Christian worship in England). In medieval iconography, Pancras was depicted as a young soldier, due to his association with the paired soldier saints Nereus and Achilleus. By the mid-nineteenth century, pious embroidery set Pancras's martyrdom in the arena among wild beasts, where the panther refrains from attacking and killing him until the martyr gives the beast permission.

Pancras is popularly venerated as the patron saint of children, jobs and health. His name is also invoked against cramps, false witnesses, headaches and perjury. His image in statue form can be found in many bars, restaurants and other businesses. He is also the patron saint of the Italian city San Pancrazio Salentino.

The Tridentine Calendar had on 12 May a joint feast (semidouble rank) of Nereus, Achilleus and Pancras. The name of Domitilla was added in 1595. The joint celebration of Nereus, Achilleus, Domitilla and Pancras continued with that ranking (see General Roman Calendar of 1954) until the revision of 1960, when it was reclassified as a third-class feast (see General Roman Calendar of 1960).

In the present General Roman Calendar, revised in 1969, Saints Nereus and Achilleus (together) and Saint Pancras have distinct celebrations (optional memorials) on 12 May. Saint Domitilla is not included in the revised calendar, because the liturgical honours once paid to her "have no basis in tradition".

See also
 Saint Pancras of Rome, patron saint archive
 St Pancras, London

References

External links
Colonnade Statue in St Peter's Square

Christian child saints
Converts to Christianity from pagan religions
Saints from Roman Anatolia
Italian saints
290 births
304 deaths
4th-century Christian martyrs
3rd-century Romans
4th-century Romans
Corsican saints
Legendary Romans
Christians martyred during the reign of Diocletian